Bovista colorata is a species of puffball fungus in the family Agaricaceae. It is found in eastern North America and northwestern South America. The puffball was first described as Lycoperdon coloratum by Charles Horton Peck in 1878, from collections made in Sand Lake, New York. Its spores are spherical, measuring 3.5–5 μm in diameter.

References

External links

Fungi described in 1878
Fungi of North America
Fungi of South America
Taxa named by Charles Horton Peck